= The International Library & Cultural Centre =

Coordinates: 23.354°N 85.326°E

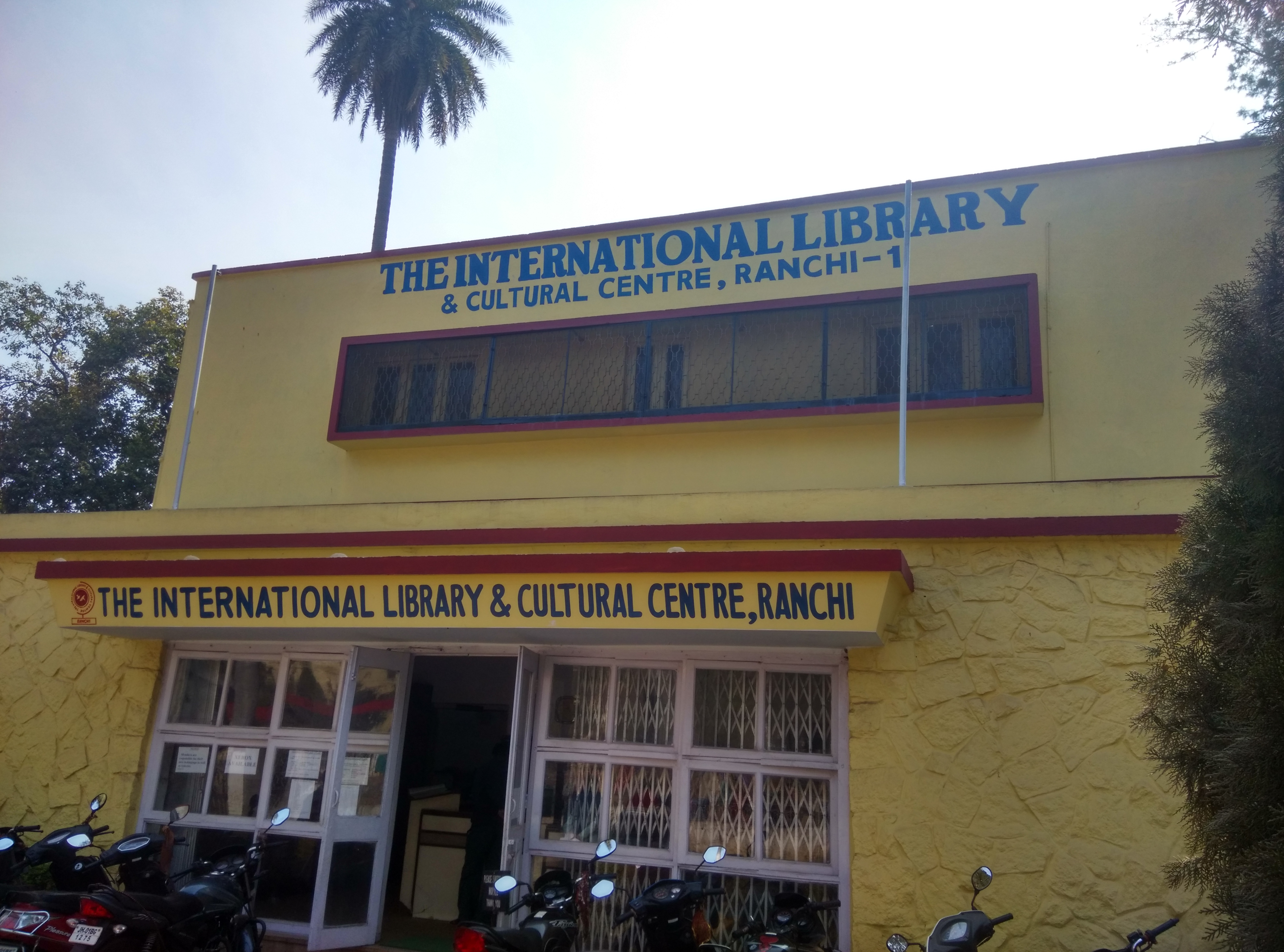

The International Library & Cultural Centre (ILCC) was established in Ranchi when the British Council division had closed its establishment in the year 1995. The ILCC is being managed by a trust at the British Council premises at Ranchi and is hosting about 36000 book stocks.
